Squads for the Football at the 1954 Asian Games played in Manila, Philippines.

Group A

Head coach:  Lee Wai Tong

Head coach:

Head coach:  Dionisio Calvo

Group B

Head coach:

Head coach:

Head coach:

Group C

Head coach:  Shigemaru Takenokoshi

Head coach:  Antun Pogačnik

Head coach:  Balaidas Chatterjee

Group D

Head coach:  Lee Yoo-hyung

Head coach:  Tom Sneddon

Hong Kong national team and Republic of China national team shared same fodder of players during pre-1971. Most (if not all) the players playing in the Hong Kong football league. The ROC team practically the A-team, while Hong Kong practically the B-team, with lesser quality of players.

Head coach:

References

External links
https://web.archive.org/web/20150524232202/http://rdfc.com.ne.kr/int/skor-intres-1948.html

Squads
1954